The Nekari are a Muslim community found in north east India.

Origin

The community is traditionally associated with selling fish. According to their traditions, the community gets its name from the word Urdu work nek, which means honest, and kar meaning living, so the Nekari literally means those who make an honest living, There is some evidence to suggest that the community are converts from the Hindu Jele caste. The Nekari are found mainly in the district of 24 Parganas, in particular along the banks of the rivers Ischamati and Raimangal. They speak Bengali and belong to the Sunni sect of Islam.

Present circumstances

The Nekari were the traditional fish mongers of Bengal, and the community remains associated with this occupation. A majority however are now daily wage labourers. They are strictly endogamous, and marry close kin. There customs are similar to other Bengali Muslim communities.

See also

Mallaah

References

Social groups of West Bengal
Muslim communities of India
Fishing communities in India